Reverse innovation or trickle-up innovation is an innovation seen or used first in the developing world, before spreading to the industrialized world. The term was popularized by Dartmouth professors Vijay Govindarajan and Chris Trimble and General Electric's Jeffrey R. Immelt. Subsequently, Vijay Govindarajan and Chris Trimble published the book Reverse Innovation. 

Reverse innovation is the process whereby goods developed as inexpensive models to meet the needs of developing nations, such as battery-operated medical instruments in countries with limited infrastructure, are then repackaged as low-cost innovative goods for Western buyers.

Definition 
The process of reverse innovation begins by focusing on needs and requirements for low-cost products in countries like India. Once products are developed for these markets, they are then sold elsewhere – even in the West – at low prices which creates new markets and uses for these innovations.

Typically, companies start their globalization efforts by removing expensive features from their established product, and attempt to sell these de-featured products in the developing world.  This approach, unfortunately, is not very competitive, and targets only the most affluent segments of society in these developing countries. Reverse innovation, on the other hand, leads to products which are created locally in developing countries, tested in local markets, and, if successful, then upgraded for sale and delivery in the developed world.

The term 'reverse innovation' was originally defined differently as – innovation blowback – by John Hagel III and John Seely Brown in their 2005 McKinsey Quarterly article titled Innovation blowback: Disruptive management practices from Asia. In essence, their message warns that "the periphery of today's global business environment is where innovation potential is the highest... Edges define and describe the borders of companies, markets, industries, geographies, intellectual disciplines, and generations. They are the places where unmet customer needs find unexpected solutions, where disruptive innovations and blue oceans get birthed, and where edge capabilities transform the core competencies of the corporation."

C.K. Prahalad explains that there are five ways in which resource-starved developing countries lead rich nations: 1) affordability, 2) leapfrog technologies, 3) service ecosystems, 4) robust systems, and 5) add-on applications. These very deprivations are catalysts for reverse innovation.

Reverse innovation in global health systems 

Reverse innovation has been identified as a key emerging trend in global health systems. Key health areas where low-income countries can offer solutions to medium and high-income country settings include, rural health service delivery; skills substitution; decentralisation of management; creative problem-solving; education in communicable disease control; innovation in mobile phone use; low technology simulation training; local product manufacture; health financing; and social entrepreneurship. System-wide benefits may also be seen as accruing across every part of the World Health Organization Health Systems Framework, specifically the six building blocks of health systems: (1) service delivery; (2) health workforce; (3) health information; (4) medical products, vaccines, and technologies; (5) health financing; and (6) health leadership and governance. However, the applicability of developing country innovations in developed country settings remains relatively undocumented and further work needs to be undertaken to advance understanding of health innovation diffusion between countries.

Other examples

Examples of reverse innovation can be found across various industries and geographies:

– Nokia is testing new business models for classified ads in Kenya; it has also created new features in its hand-held phones sold in the US, based on observations of how phones are shared in Ghana.

– Microsoft is creating new phone app services for "dumb" phones which allow users with existing, non-smartphone devices to access Web sites such as Twitter, Facebook. Built for markets in India and South Africa, there is surprising potential for these apps as a low-cost cloud computing platform.

– GE is now selling an ultra-portable electrocardiograph machine in the U.S. at an 80% markdown for similar products. The machine was originally built by GE Healthcare for doctors in India and China.

– In 2009, Tata Motors planned to sell an upgraded version of the Tata Nano in western markets; the project was called Tata Europa (but it actually never reached the expected market).

– Procter & Gamble found that a honey-based cold remedy created for Mexico also had a profitable market in Europe and the United States.

– Nestlé learned that it could sell its low-cost, low-fat dried noodles originally created for rural India and position the same product as a healthy alternative in Australia and New Zealand.

Reverse innovations may or may not be disruptive innovations.

References

Development economics
Innovation economics
Strategic management